Evils of the Night is a 1985 American low-budget science fiction horror film starring Aldo Ray, Neville Brand, Tina Louise, John Carradine, and Julie Newmar. The film was directed, co-produced and co-written by Mardi Rustam.

Plot
"Space vampires" Dr. Kozmar (Carradine) and his assistants, Dr. Zarma (Newmar) and Cora (Louise), recruit two sadistic garage mechanics (Ray and Brand) to abduct teenagers living in a college town and bring them to a rural hospital. There, the aliens drain them of their blood, which they need to stay young, and save their dying planet.

Cast

Production
Filming began in June 1984 in Los Angeles and completed in October 1984.

Only mainstream film appearances of adult film stars Crystal Breeze and Jody Swafford. It is also the first mainstream role for adult film star Amber Lynn, who went on to appear in other mainstream movies and shows in her career. All three were cast to add nudity and sex to the film in order to appeal to a bigger audience.

Release
The film premiered in New York City on October 25, 1985.

Critical response
Reviews were generally negative. A reviewer at the Atlanta Journal-Constitution wrote, Evils of the Night is an attempt to introduce an appalling new genre: The "Teen Sex Comedy-Slice 'N' Dice Thriller-Martians Have Landed Combo." Roger Hurlburt at the Fort Lauderdale Sun Sentinel wrote, "Simply stated, Evils of the Night is a deplorable motion picture." Michael Weldon in his 1996 Psychotronic Video Guide described this as a good example of "inept filmmaking" and an opportunity to "see once-popular stars degraded."

See also
Evil Town

References

External links

1980s science fiction horror films
American erotic horror films
1985 horror films
Pornographic horror films
Films scored by Robert O. Ragland
American science fiction horror films
1980s English-language films
1980s American films